Algassime Bah (born 12 November 2002) is a Guinean professional footballer who plays as a striker for Greek Super League 2 club Olympiacos B.

Career
In 2019, Bah was sent on loan to Russian lower league side Vista. In 2021, he signed for Olympiacos in the Greek top flight after receiving interest from Spanish La Liga club Atlético Madrid, AA Gent in Belgium, Italian Serie A team Milan, and France. On 19 September 2021, he debuted for Olympiacos during a 0–0 draw with Atromitos.

References

External links
 Soccerway.com Profile

Guinean footballers
Expatriate footballers in Russia
Living people
Guinean expatriate sportspeople in Russia
Association football forwards
Olympiacos F.C. players
Super League Greece 2 players
Super League Greece players
2002 births
Guinean expatriate sportspeople in Greece
Guinean expatriate footballers
Expatriate footballers in Greece
Olympiacos F.C. B players